Dream 2 was a Canadian exempt Category B Arabic language specialty channel and was owned by Ethnic Channels Group. It broadcast programming from Dream 2 as well as local Canadian content.

Dream 2 was a top rated general interest television channel from Egypt.  It featured a wide variety of programming including news, current affairs, sports, movies and popular series including comedies & dramas. The channel ceased to exist by 2015 as the Dream TV network became only one channel for the first time since 2001.

External links
 Ethnic Channels Group page

Digital cable television networks in Canada
Television channels and stations established in 2011
Egyptian-Canadian culture
2011 establishments in Canada
Arabic-language television in Canada